Abbott is an unincorporated community in Hardin County, in the U.S. state of Iowa. It is at the junction of 150th Street and V Avenue.

History
Abbott was platted near the junction of the Burlington, Cedar Rapids and Northern Railway and the Iowa Central Railway, in Sections 34 and 35 of Aetna Township (now Etna Township). The depot was located nearly a half a mile north of Abbott. 

Abbott's population was 53 in 1902, and 106 in 1925.

References

Unincorporated communities in Hardin County, Iowa
Unincorporated communities in Iowa